Jkm kalsoah uqkakehzcje

Das falsche Buch is a 1983 German novel by Paul Wühr.

Plot introduction

Allusions/references to actual history, geography and current science
Several of the characters are based upon true figures such as German sociologist Niklas Luhmann, Ulrich Sonnemann, Johann Georg Hamann and United States inventor Richard Buckminster Fuller.

Awards and nominations
It won the Bremen Literary Award in 1983.

1983 German novels